The Polka-Dot Man (Abner Krill) is a supervillain appearing in comic books published by DC Comics. He is primarily a minor enemy of Batman, and belongs to the collective of adversaries that make up his rogues gallery.

The character made his live-action debut in the DC Extended Universe film The Suicide Squad (2021), portrayed by David Dastmalchian.

Publication history 
The Polka-Dot Man first appeared in Detective Comics #300 (February 1962).

Fictional character biography

Becoming the Polka-Dot Man 
Shortly after Batman began appearing in Gotham City, his growing renown inspired an entire generation of costumed rogues who committed largely harmless crimes to attract his attention in the hopes of matching wits with the legendary vigilante. Among these was a local crook named Abner Krill, who decided, for reasons unknown, to launch a crime wave based on spots and dots in Gotham City, where he inevitably came into conflict with Batman and  Robin. As Mister Polka-Dot, he wore a costume covered in spots (which, being different sizes and colors were not actual polka dots); once removed from the costume, the spots could be used for a variety of purposes, such as creating deadly weapons and a bizarre escape vehicle. He succeeded in capturing Robin, but Batman defeated him.

Return to villainy 
Years later, Krill (now calling himself the Polka-Dot Man) was driven to crime once more when he found himself unemployed, penniless, and desperate to pay his bills. No longer able to afford his original electronically gimmicked costume, he instead resorted to using a baseball bat in a poorly thought-out attempt to rob a jewelry store, which resulted in him assaulting Officer Foley of the Gotham City Police Department, causing minor injuries. He was then beaten badly by Detective Harvey Bullock, who was sick of costumed villains in the city. The assault put the Polka-Dot Man in traction and he filed a brutality suit against the police department, which resulted in Bullock being forced to see a psychiatrist.

Following his recovery, Krill became a committed alcoholic who spent more time drinking himself into a stupor in sleazy bars than troubling Batman. The fact that Robin had tracked him down with a leopard became something of a running joke among other villains. As Nightwing, Dick Grayson encountered the Polka-Dot Man a second time when he trashed My Alibi, a bar known for underworld regulars who vouched for each other's whereabouts when they were off committing crimes. Nightwing pitched Krill through a window display and into the street, where he was picked up by the police.

Death 
Later, Mister Polka-Dot (having resumed his original alias) reappeared with a new look, joining a group of villains working for General Immortus. Immortus, with the help of Professor Milo, upgraded the villains' powers and gadgets. As a follower of General Immortus, Mister Polka-Dot has presumably been operated upon by Professor Milo to internalize his technology. The group was undone when they were betrayed by the Human Flame. Most were killed in the brutal battle, including Mister Polka-Dot. His head was crushed after a manhole cover landed on it.

Powers and abilities 
When he created his costume, Abner Krill possessed advanced technology in the form of the costume's polka dots, which were controlled through the costume's belt. When attached to his costume, they were inert, but once removed, they would enlarge in size and become various different devices which could aid in his crime sprees, most notably a flying saucer which he used as a getaway vehicle.

Gimmicked dots used by the Polka-Dot Man included:

 Flying Buzzsaw Dot, a red polka dot designed as a projectile. The dot had a rotating interior mechanism upon which a circular saw blade was mounted.
 Flying Saucer Dot, a yellow polka dot which expanded rapidly into a flat, man-sized glider. It was steered by a series of buttons or switches on the Polka-Dot Man's belt.
 Sun Dot, a gold polka dot designed as a projectile. It was gimmicked to resemble a model of the sun and emitted a blinding, disorienting light similar to a flare.
 Bubble Dot, a white polka dot which expanded into a translucent capsule capable of flight. Like the Flying Saucer Dot, it was steered by a belt apparatus.
 Fist Dots were red, yellow, and orange polka dots designed as projectiles. They were thrown at once and gimmicked to resemble human fists. When bounced off opponents at close range and in concert, these dots could produce concussive effects.
 Hole Dot, a black polka dot simply referred to as a "hole" by the Polka-Dot Man. It opened up what appeared to be a teleportation transport system and was presumably developed with assistance from General Immortus.
 Bangles, when the bangles are open, this liberates a huge amount of acid polka-dots whose direction Abner can manipulate.

In other media

Television 
The Polka-Dot Man makes minor non-speaking appearances in Batman: The Brave and the Bold.

Film 
 The Polka-Dot Man makes a minor non-speaking appearance in The Lego Batman Movie.
 The Polka-Dot Man appears in The Suicide Squad, portrayed by David Dastmalchian. This version is the son of a S.T.A.R. Labs scientist who exposed him and his siblings to an interdimensional virus in an attempt to turn them into superheroes. As a result, he manifested a disease that causes him to grow multicolored polka-dots and glowing pustules on his body over time, which he has to expel at least twice a day and can use as destructive projectiles. After killing his mother, he was sent to Belle Reve Penitentiary, and due to his traumatic upbringing perceives everyone around him as his mother. In the present, Polka-Dot Man is recruited by Amanda Waller to join Task Force X and sent to infiltrate and destroy a Corto Maltese laboratory called Jötunheim containing Starro. While assisting the squad in an assault on the alien, Polka-Dot Man is crushed by Starro.

Video games 
 The Polka-Dot Man appears as an unlockable playable character in Lego Batman 3: Beyond Gotham, voiced by Dee Bradley Baker.
 The Polka-Dot Man appears as an unlockable playable character in Lego DC Super-Villains, voiced by Greg Miller.

Miscellaneous 
 Polka-Dot Man makes a cameo appearance in Batman '66 #30.
 Polka-Dot Man appears in the Injustice 2 prequel comic as a member of the Suicide Squad until he is killed by Jason Todd disguised as a murderous Batman imposter.

See also 
 List of Batman family enemies

References 

 

Superhero film characters
DC Comics male supervillains
DC Comics metahumans
DC Comics characters who can teleport
Characters created by Bill Finger
Characters created by Sheldon Moldoff
Comics characters introduced in 1962
DC Comics supervillains
Batman characters
Suicide Squad members